Andreas Hanakamp (born 1 July 1966) is an Austrian sailor who has competed in two Olympic Games as well many other sailing events including the 1996 Hong-Kong-Challenge, Bacardi Cup, Rolex Fastnet Race and most recently, is competing in the 2008-09 Volvo Ocean Race.

Hanakamp has sailed over 150,000 miles offshore, with 30,000 miles offshore racing experience. Andreas works as a professional sailor and also owns his own sailing services company based in Austria.
He is married to Nicole, they have three children; Lisa, Nicola and Marie.

Achievements

Hanakamp is an ambassador to the Year of the Dolphin project.

Volvo Ocean Race

Hanakamp was the press officer for the 2001–02 Volvo Ocean Race, and skipper for Team Russia in the 2008–09 Volvo Ocean Race.

Star class results

References

External links 
 
 
 
 Andreas Hanakamp: Homepage
 Team Russia Homepage

1966 births
Living people
Austrian male sailors (sport)
Olympic sailors of Austria
Sailors at the 1996 Summer Olympics – Star
Sailors at the 2004 Summer Olympics – Star
Volvo Ocean Race sailors